Paul Wesly Young (December 7, 1908—October 19, 1978) was an American player in the National Football League whose briefly-held position as center for the Green Bay Packers enabled him to participate in two professional games during the 1933 season.             

Born in the small Minnesota city of Melrose, Paul Young, at 6'4" 195 lbs, originally played college football at the University of Oklahoma and, at the age of 24, two years after graduation, had his brief opportunity with the Packers.  He died in the small Nebraska city of Cambridge seven weeks before his 70th birthday.

References

External links
NFL.com player page

People from Melrose, Minnesota
American football centers
Oklahoma Sooners football players
Green Bay Packers players
1908 births
1978 deaths
People from Cambridge, Nebraska